Psammotropha is a genus of flowering plants belonging to the family Molluginaceae.

Its native range is Tanzania to Southern Africa.

Species:

Psammotropha alternifolia 
Psammotropha anguina 
Psammotropha diffusa 
Psammotropha frigida 
Psammotropha marginata 
Psammotropha mucronata 
Psammotropha myriantha 
Psammotropha obovata 
Psammotropha obtusa 
Psammotropha quadrangularis 
Psammotropha spicata

References

Molluginaceae
Caryophyllales genera